Michael P. Dempsey is a former acting Director of National Intelligence, serving from January 20, 2017 to March 15, 2017.

Biography
Previously, Dempsey served as the deputy director of national intelligence and President Obama's primary intelligence briefer from 2014 to 2017. In this role, he led the integration of the US intelligence community's 16 agencies. Dempsey also regularly participated in National Security Council, Principal, and Deputy Committee meetings and presented congressional testimony.

Dempsey is a member of the Council on Foreign Relations (CFR). Formerly CFR's National Intelligence Fellow, Dempsey published 45 articles in more than a dozen publications, including Foreign Affairs, Foreign Policy, Bloomberg, CNN, WIRED, Harvard Business Review, Washington Post, Wall Street Journal, and the New York Times.

Dempsey is currently vice president of government affairs for space, cyber, and intelligence at Northrop Grumman. He is also a non-resident research scholar at Columbia University.

Selected publications 
"No Longer A Haven for International Terrorists", New York Times 
"How the US Can Counter Threats from DIY Weapons and Automation", WIRED
"The News from Yemen is Terrible - Let's Focus on What Can be Achieved", Washington Post
"Remaining Objective is Hard, But the Best Leaders Figure Out How to Do it", Harvard Business Review
"A Better Guide to National Security Decision-Making", War on the Rocks
"The Making of a Career Intelligence Official", War on the Rocks
"The Black Swans of 2018", Politico
"Winning the National Security Long Game Takes Technology Innovation", The Hill

References 

Living people
Trump administration cabinet members
United States Directors of National Intelligence
Year of birth missing (living people)